Paint Your Wagon is a 1969 American Western musical film starring Lee Marvin, Clint Eastwood, and Jean Seberg. The film was adapted by Paddy Chayefsky from the 1951 musical Paint Your Wagon by Lerner and Loewe. It is set in a mining camp in Gold Rush-era California. It was directed by Joshua Logan.

Plot
When a wagon crashes into a ravine, prospector Ben Rumson (Lee Marvin) finds two adult male occupants, brothers, one of whom is dead and the other of whom has a broken arm and leg. While burying the dead man, gold dust is discovered at the grave site. Ben stakes a claim on the land and adopts the surviving brother (Clint Eastwood) as his "Pardner" while he recuperates.

Pardner is innocent and romantic, singing a love song about an imaginary girl ("I Still See Elisa"). He hopes to make enough in the gold rush to buy some land and is suspicious of the fast-living Ben. Ben claims that while he is willing to fight, steal, and cheat at cards, he will never betray a partner. Ben will share the spoils of prospecting on the condition that Pardner takes care of him in his moments of drunkenness and melancholy.

After the discovery of gold, "No Name City" springs up as a tent city, with the miners alternating between wild parties ("Hand Me Down That Can o' Beans") and bouts of loneliness ("They Call the Wind Maria"). The men become frustrated with the lack of female companionship, and the arrival of Jacob Woodling (John Mitchum), a Mormon with two wives, is enough to catch the attention of the entire town. The miners persuade Woodling to sell one of his wives to the highest bidder. Elizabeth (Jean Seberg), Jacob's younger and more rebellious wife, agrees to be sold based on the reasoning that whatever she gets can't be as bad as what she currently has.

Still drunk, Ben winds up with the highest bid for Elizabeth. Ben is readied for the wedding by the other miners ("Whoop-Ti-Ay"), and is married to Elizabeth under "mining law", with Ben being granted exclusive rights to "all her mineral resources." Elizabeth, not content to be treated as property, threatens to shoot Ben on their wedding night if she is not treated with respect. While she believes Ben is not the type to truly settle down, she views their arrangement as acceptable if he will build a proper wooden cabin to provide her with some security for when he inevitably leaves. Ben, impressed by Elizabeth's determination, enlists the miners to help him keep this promise, and Elizabeth rejoices in having a proper home ("A Million Miles Away Behind the Door").

News comes of the pending arrival of "six French tarts" to a neighboring town via stagecoach. A plan is hatched to divert the stagecoach under false pretenses and bring the women to "No Name City" ("There's a Coach Comin' In"), thus finally providing the other miners with female companionship. Ben heads up the mission and leaves Elizabeth in the care of Pardner. The two fall in love ("I Talk to the Trees"), whereupon Elizabeth, saying she also still loves Ben, convinces them that "if a Mormon man can have two wives, why can't a woman have two husbands?" The polyandrous arrangement works until the town becomes large enough that civilized people from the East begin to settle there. A parson (Alan Dexter) begins to make a determined effort to persuade the people of No Name City to give up their evil ways ("The Gospel of No Name City"). Meanwhile, Ben and a group of miners discover that gold dust is dropping through the floor boards of many of the saloons. They tunnel under all the businesses to get the gold ("The Best Things in Life Are Dirty").

A group of new settlers is rescued from the snow and the strait-laced family is invited to spend the winter with Elizabeth and Pardner, who is assumed to be her only husband. Ben is left to fend for himself ("Wand'rin' Star"). In revenge, he introduces one of the family, naive young Horton Fenty (Tom Ligon), to the pleasures of Rotten Luck Willie's (Harve Presnell) saloon and brothel. This leads to Elizabeth dismissing both Ben and Pardner from the log cabin, and Pardner takes to gambling in Willie's ("Gold Fever"). During a bull-and-bear fight, the rampaging bull falls into the tunnel complex dug by Ben and the others and knocks out all of the support beams, causing the streets and buildings to collapse. Eventually, the town is destroyed entirely. Ben departs for other gold fields, commenting that he never knew Pardner's real name, which Pardner then reveals: Sylvester Newel. Elizabeth and Pardner reconcile and plan to stay, while musing about Ben's next great adventure.

Cast

 Lee Marvin as Ben Rumson
 Clint Eastwood as Sylvester Newel/"Pardner"
 Jean Seberg as Elizabeth
 Harve Presnell as Rotten Luck Willie
 Ray Walston as "Mad Jack" Duncan
 Tom Ligon as Horton Fenty
 Alan Dexter as The Parson
 William O'Connell as Horace Tabor
 Ben Baker as Haywood Holbrook
 Alan Baxter as Mr. Fenty
 Paula Trueman as Mrs. Fenty
 Robert Easton as Atwell
 Geoffrey Norman as Foster
 H.B. Haggerty as Steve Bull
 Terry Jenkins as Joe Mooney
 Karl Bruck as Schermerhorn
 John Mitchum as Jacob Woodling
 Sue Casey as Sarah Woodling
 Eddie Little Sky as Indian
 Harvey Parry as Higgins
 H.W. Gim as Wong
 William Mims as Frock-coated man
 Roy Jenson as Hennessey
 Pat Hawley as Clendennon

Musical numbers
All songs written by Alan Jay Lerner and Frederick Loewe, unless otherwise noted.
 "I'm on My Way" – Chorus
 "I Still See Elisa" – Pardner
 "The First Thing You Know" (Lerner/André Previn) – Ben
 "Hand Me Down That Can o' Beans" – Chorus, including the Nitty Gritty Dirt Band
 "They Call the Wind Maria" – Rotten Luck Willie and Chorus
 "Whoop-Ti-Ay!" – Chorus
 "A Million Miles Away Behind the Door" (Lerner/Previn) – Elizabeth
 "I Talk to the Trees" – Pardner
 "There's a Coach Comin' In" – Rotten Luck Willie and Chorus
 "The Gospel of No Name City" (Lerner/Previn) – Parson
 "Best Things" (Lerner/Previn) – Ben, Mad Jack, and Pardner
 "Wand'rin' Star" – Ben and Chorus
 "Gold Fever" (Lerner/Previn) – Pardner and Chorus
 "Finale (I'm on My Way)" – Ben, Mad Jack, and Chorus

Charts

Production
Multiple attempts were made to adapt Alan Jay Lerner's Paint Your Wagon into a film. Warner Bros. considered making the film with Doris Day and Paramount Pictures considered making it with Bing Crosby. Louis B. Mayer purchased the film rights before his death in 1957., and Paramount bought the rights from his estate.

Lerner, who wrote the screenplays for An American in Paris, Gigi, and My Fair Lady, produced the film. Lerner selected Joshua Logan, who previously directed the film adaption of Lerner's Camelot, to direct the film. Blake Edwards wanted to direct the film, but Lerner declined his offer and Edwards instead directed Darling Lili. The plot was significantly changed from the stage play. Lerner attempted to have Frederick Loewe compose the film's soundtrack, but he declined and instead suggested André Previn.

Clint Eastwood was selected instead of George Maharis. Lee Marvin accepted the lead role instead of appearing in The Wild Bunch. He received $1 million, while Eastwood was paid $750,000. Faye Dunaway, Mia Farrow and Tuesday Weld turned down the role of Elizabeth before Seberg was cast. Julie Andrews, Sally Ann Howes, and Diana Rigg were also considered for the role. Lesley Ann Warren, who was under contract to Paramount, had to bow out after she became pregnant.

Eastwood and Marvin did their own singing, while Seberg's songs were dubbed by Rita Gordon. Agnes de Mille was offered to choreograph the film, but declined.

Paint Your Wagon was shot near Baker City, Oregon, with filming beginning in May 1968 and ending that October. Other locations included Big Bear Lake, California and the San Bernardino National Forest; the interiors were filmed at Paramount Studios, with Joshua Logan directing. The film's initial budget was $10 million, before it eventually doubled to $20 million. A daily expense of $80,000 was incurred to transport cast and crew to the filming location, as the closest hotel was nearly 60 miles away. The elaborate camp used in the film cost $2.4 million to build.

A rainstorm destroyed the road connecting the set to Baker City and Paramount had to pay $10,000 per mile to rebuild the road. Lerner almost fell down a 400-foot cliff during filming. Hippies who had been cast as extras formed an union and threatened to strike unless their daily pay was increased to $25.

The film was released at a time when movie musicals were going out of fashion, especially with younger audiences. Its overblown budget and nearly three-hour length became notorious in the press. Eastwood was frustrated by the long delays in the making of the film, later saying that the experience strengthened his resolve to become a director. According to Robert Osborne, Marvin drank heavily during filming, which may have enhanced his screen appearance, but led to delays and many retakes.

Release
Paint Your Wagon opened at Loew's State II theatre in New York City on October 15, 1969. In the UK, Paint Your Wagon had a 79-week 70mm roadshow run at the Astoria Theatre in London.

Reception

Critical response
Vincent Canby, in his October 16, 1969 review for The New York Times, wrote that the film was "amiable... However, because amiability is never in over-abundant supply, especially in Hollywood super-productions, the movie can be enjoyed more than simply tolerated." He ended the review by expanding on its pleasantness:

On Rotten Tomatoes, the film has an approval rating of 33%, based on reviews from 18 critics.

Box office
The film grossed $50,506 in its first week. It opened in Los Angeles the following week and immediately expanded to another 12 cities. It reached number one at the US box office in its eighth week of release. The film became Paramount's sixth-largest success up to that point (and the seventh highest-grossing film of 1969); over its release, it grossed $31.6 million, although the earnings never offset the cost of production and marketing.

Soundtrack 
 Tom Scott Quartet, Paint Your Wagon (Flying Dutchman, 1970)
Marvin's rendition of "Wand'rin' Star," accompanied by the film's choir, became a number one hit in the UK. His voice was described by Jean Seberg as "like rain gurgling down a rusty pipe". Interviewed on NPR, Marvin said that the song was a hit in Australia, and someone there described it as "The first 33⅓ recorded at 45."

References

Works cited

External links
 
 
 
 
 

1969 films
1960s English-language films
1960s Western (genre) musical films
American Western (genre) musical films
Baker City, Oregon
Films about polygamy
Films about the California Gold Rush
Films based on musicals
Films directed by Joshua Logan
Films scored by André Previn
Films scored by Frederick Loewe
Films set in California
Films set in the 1850s
Films shot in Big Bear Lake, California
Films shot in California
Films shot in Oregon
Films with screenplays by Alan Jay Lerner
Films with screenplays by Paddy Chayefsky
Malpaso Productions films
Films about mining
Mormonism in fiction
Paramount Pictures films
Works about polygamy in Mormonism
1960s American films